The Wuhan–Shenzhen Expressway, designated as G0422 and commonly abbreviated as Wushen Expressway is an expressway in Central South China linking the cities of Wuhan, Hubei and Shenzhen, Guangdong.

Route

References

Expressways in Hubei
Expressways in Guangdong
0422